Broderick Dornell Smiley (born August 10, 1968) is an American stand-up comedian, television host, actor, and radio personality, known for his prank phone calls. The calls feature Smiley disguising his voice and carrying on a conversation with the recipient of the call.  He is the host of the nationally syndicated Rickey Smiley Morning Show based in Atlanta from its flagship affiliate WHTA "Hot 107.9". Smiley has starred in sitcom The Rickey Smiley Show, which aired on TV One. He is also a featured columnist on the Fox-produced tabloid nationally-syndicated show Dish Nation. In 2015, Smiley started appearing on Rickey Smiley For Real, a reality television series about his life.

Career

Smiley appeared as the host of the 2000 season of BET's ComicView program. He has also appeared on Showtime at the Apollo, HBO's Def Comedy Jam, HBO's Snaps, The Nashville Network, Uptown Comedy Club, and Comic Escape.  His original comedy routines often feature the role-play of fictional characters such as "Bernice Jenkins" (also known as Granny Swims, Ms. Johnson or Mrs. Francis), "Lil' Daryl", "Rusty Dale" and "Beauford". Bernice Jenkins has a grandson named Rufus, who's a stereotype of the modern-day "Gangsta". He is referenced in "Two Of My Toes Fell Off" and another prank phone call where Smiley calls a pharmacy.

Smiley became the morning show personality for radio station KBFB in Dallas, Texas in April 2004. The show features the trademark prank calls, as well as news, information and the latest hip hop music.  In 2008, Smiley signed a deal with Syndication One (a syndicated radio division of Radio One) to take the show nationwide, and The Rickey Smiley Morning Show is now heard on a number of mainstream urban radio stations. Syndication One merged into Reach Media in 2013.

He has also released several humorous songs based on his bits, such as "Roll Tide" featuring his redneck character Buford, and "We Miss Robert", based on a routine of his in which a friend of a deceased drug dealer performs a rap song called "We Miss Robert" at the funeral, which is actually a song about a woman, performed in hopes of landing a record deal.

Smiley had a starring role in Ice Cube's Friday After Next.

He also appeared in All About the Benjamins as an informant of Ice Cube's character, Snitch Mitch. His appearance can be viewed in a deleted scene in the special features of the DVD.

Prank calls
Some of Smiley's most notable calls include:
"Buried Alive" - Smiley plays a narcoleptic who works at a funeral home and "fell asleep in one of these caskets" who calls a cemetery claiming that "they done buried me alive" and insists he is calling from inside a casket on his cell phone. He then requests that someone come and "dig all these graves open".
"Come Over" - in a bit of a reverse prank (similar to the ones the Jerky Boys innovated), a hapless caller known as "K.D." calls a Smiley character named "Gina", a woman who initially entices him with statements like "I'm just 'bout to go crazy over here" and "I want you to come over and hurt me" before revealing she is a hermaphrodite ("that means I got both genitals"). K.D. assures Gina he is "still comin'", which prompts her to up the stakes by announcing that "my grandmama over here too...she a real freak." K.D. then speaks to the grandmother who demands "I want you to scrub my head to the white meat" and wants to know "what kind of draws you got on."
"Uncle Melvin" - Smiley prank calls his uncle, as a man who believes his girlfriend has left him, and who punctuates every remark with the word "dawg" ("Is my girl over there dawg...tell her I love her, dawg").
"Churches" - Smiley plays two characters in this call, both of whom call Church's Chicken. One is an elderly lady who mistakes Church's for a "church" (e.g. wants to know "what time do y'all start service" and asks "who is y'all's pastor", and "well when d y'all have Sunday school?"); when informed that she has called a restaurant, asks "Don't the chicken belong to the church?" The other caller is "Willie", who claims to be a heavyset man with a thyroid problem ("I can't get out the house no more"), and who asks for a rundown of the menu ("Is y'all okra fried, or is it all slimy in the pot, like grandmama used to make") and who constantly requests delivery of food to his house.
"Pray For Me" - Using his "Granny" voice again, Smiley calls "Miss Ola Mae Benton Carter Jackson Glenn", and asks her to pray for a member of her church, who had been:
stabbed
involved in an ambulance crash
hit by a train
had a leg cut off by the Jaws of Life
shot "in the right eye"
Smiley then gets the woman to lead her in several verses of "Walk With Me, Lord", each verse increasing in silliness.
"She P-E-E-D" - Smiley prank calls an elderly woman using his "Granny" voice; the aftermath of the call causes the woman to laugh so hard that she ends up urinating on herself.
"Is My Daddy Over There" - Smiley plays Lil' Daryl and his brother Brandon as they call a lady claiming their father was supposed to return home with milk for their cereal. The brothers ask the lady what she has cooked for dinner over there as she ultimately hangs up on them in frustration.
"Whose Funeral is Today?" - Smiley uses his "Granny" voice and calls a funeral home, asking for her deceased neighbor named Wilbert Smith. She learns that he was cremated and she was oblivious to his death, screaming out in agony when the funeral director repeats that he was cremated. The lady then asks who they are burying this week and offers to go to that funeral to make up for missing Wilbert's. The man tells her that the person they are burying is Hattie Mae Barkley, as she screams out again in agony as it is another person she knows.

Personal life
On July 6, 2020, Smiley announced that his daughter, Aaryn, was shot during a road rage incident the previous weekend.

Smiley is a member of Omega Psi Phi, having been initiated into its Psi Rho graduate chapter. 

On January 29, 2023, Smiley announced his 32-year old-son, Brandon Smiley, had died after being found unconscious in his Birmingham apartment. The cause of death is pending.

Filmography

Film

Television

Special

Discography
To date, Smiley has released six albums of his prank calls:

The Best of Comedian Rickey Smiley Vol. I
Rickey Smiley: Prank Calls Vol. II
Rickey Smiley: Vol. III
Rickey Smiley "Off The Hook Volume 4"
Rickey Smiley: Vol. V 
Rickey Smiley: Vol. 6

See also
Tube Bar prank calls

References

External links
Official Site
Official Morning Show Site

1968 births
African-American male actors
Alabama State University alumni
African-American radio personalities
African-American stand-up comedians
American stand-up comedians
African-American television personalities
Living people
Male actors from Birmingham, Alabama
Prank calling
21st-century American comedians
21st-century African-American people
20th-century African-American people